Peter Barber is a British architect recognised for his work designing social housing. He has been praised for his attempts to address the lack of homeless shelters and social housing provision in a way that aspires to well-designed urbanism.

Professional background 
In 1989 Barber founded Peter Barber Architects, a practice that principally designs mixed-use and residential schemes.

He is currently a lecturer and reader in architecture at the University of Westminster.

He has presented at numerous events including the Architecture Foundation and Babican's series Architecture on Stage; the Royal Institute of British Architects; the Architectural League of New York; and international and domestic university schools of architecture including Helsinki, Pretoria, Ahmedabad, Mumbai, Burma, Munich, Genoa Istanbul and Colombo as well as Oxford University and The Bartlett - University College London. 

In 2019, his work was displayed at the Design Museum, London.

Selected awards 

 2021 Architects Journal AJ100 award for an outstanding contribution to architecture
 2021 Officer of the Order of the British Empire (OBE) for services to architecture
 2021 four RIBA National Awards

Publications 
‘Project Interrupted: Lectures by British Housing Architects’, published by the Architecture Foundation, ISBN	9781999646202

References

Year of birth missing (living people)
Living people